André Cheong Weng Chon (born September 1966), is the Secretary for Administration and Justice, the second most senior government official in Macau.

Early life

Cheong Weng Chon was born in Beijing in 1966. He received a Bachelor of Arts in the Portuguese language from Beijing Foreign Studies University and a law degree from the University of Macau.

Career

Cheong worked in Macau as an assistant to the Registrar and the Notary Public, as Registrar of the Real Estate Registry and as Director of the Judicial Affairs Bureau. He later served as Director of the Legal Affairs Bureau from November 2000 to December 2014. He held the post of Commissioner Against Corruption from December 2014 to December 2019.

Cheong served as President of the Legal Aid Commission, a member of the Public Administration Reform Consultation Committee and a member of the Law Reform Consultative Committee. In 2019 he was appointed Secretary for Administration and Justice in Macau.

References

External links 
 Official government biography

1966 births
University of Macau alumni
Living people
Macau people
Government ministers of Macau
Beijing Foreign Studies University alumni